Foebus abierat ("Phoebus had gone") is a medieval Latin poem, authorship unknown, composed near the end of the 10th century in Northern Italy. Described as "hauntingly beautiful" and "one of the joys of medieval poetry," it is an erotic dream-vision lyric spoken by a woman who grieves the departure of her lover Phoebus, brother of the Moon. Although the language is ecclesiastical Latin, none of its content is explicitly Christian.

An English translation of Foebus abierat by the Irish poet Eavan Boland was published in the April 2008 issue of Poetry magazine. Boland describes the poem as the "long-ago cry of a woman finding and losing a body and soul":

Jane Stevenson speculated in her book Women Latin Poets that this "highly original poem" was written by a nun.

The text
The poem was rediscovered in 1960 by the medieval-lyric specialist Peter Dronke in a Bodleian manuscript dating ca. 1000 and copied at the monastery of Fleury on the river Loire. Dronke published the history of the text, critical apparatus, and commentary in Medieval Latin and the Rise of European Love-Lyric (Oxford 1968, 2nd ed.), vol. 2, pp. 332–341. He has remarked that "the excitement of those moments of first finding and reading it, and realizing what it was, remains vivid in the memory even after sixteen years."

The poem
The unnamed female speaker recalls a night in April when her lover, Phoebus, visited her and then departs mysteriously. In a prose approximation:

If the poem dramatizes a particular story, its source is unknown. In classical mythology, Phoebus can be another name for Apollo, god of music, healing, prophecy, and other forms of enlightenment who eventually shared Helios's role as embodiment of the Sun.

The form
The poem, in monorhyme, is structured in five strophes of five lines each in a meter adapted from the classical asclepiad. In form, Foebus abierat also resembles 8th–9th-century Latin poems in simple rhymed strophes and draws on the vernacular ballad tradition.

Sources and influences

As Boland remarks on the relation of classical to medieval Latin in the poem, "The old language is present, but a skin of liturgy and sorcery has been laid over it."

Classical elements
Foebus abierat echoes the poetry of Ovid in both language and situation, most strongly the Heroides — particularly Epistula 13 in which Laodamia addresses her bridegroom Protesilaos, who has just sailed for Troy; and Epistula 10, in which Ariadne awakes to find herself abandoned by Theseus — and the Ceyx and Alcyone episode of Metamorphoses 11.

Christian allegory
Although the poem makes no specific references to Christ or Church doctrine, it has nevertheless been read, as is often the case with erotic poetry of the Middle Ages, in light of the Song of Songs as an allegory of the Bride. Dronke, who believes the author of Foebus abierat was a man, suggests that the dreamlike erotic moment that ends with the lover disappearing and his bride in desolation has its origin in the Song of Songs, as does the enigma of whether the lover was even real.

A feminist interpretation of the poem suggests that if the poet is a woman, she might have chosen secular language, particularly verbal echoes of classical antiquity, to express sexual desire in a manner that was deliberately freed of the Church's dogmatic constraints. M.B. Pranger reads the poem as "unambiguously profane in its meaning."

The ballad tradition
A theme of medieval ballads is the visitation of a woman by her lover's ghost, which then disappears with the cock's crow, that is, at dawn — a motif also of the alba.

Musical versions
The early music ensemble Sequentia performs and has recorded a setting of Foebus abierat as part of its "Lost Songs of a Rhineland Harper" program.

Selected bibliography
Boland, Eavan. Translator's note to "Phoebus was gone, all gone, his journey over." Poetry, April 2008, p. 37 online; text of translation.
Dronke, Peter. "Learned Lyric and Popular Ballad in the Early Middle Ages." In The Medieval Poet and His World. Storia e letteratura raccolta di studi e test 164. Rome 1984, pp. 167ff. with Latin text online.
Dronke, Peter. Sources of Inspiration: Studies in Literary Transformations, 400–1500. Storia e letterature raccolta di studi e testi 196. Rome 1997. Limited preview online.
Stevenson, Jane. Women Latin Poets. Oxford University Press, 2005, p. 116 online.

References

Early medieval Latin literature
Latin poetry
Erotic poetry
Visionary poems